"Ponte Pa' Mí" is a song recorded by Puerto Rican singer Rauw Alejandro, Puerto Rican rapper Myke Towers, and Colombian producer Sky Rompiendo for Alejandro's debut studio album, Afrodisíaco (2020). The song was written by Alejandro, Sky, Orlando J. Cepeda, José M. Reyes Díaz, Towers, Colla, and Eric Duars, while the production was handled by Sky. It was released for digital download and streaming by Duars Entertainment on April 16, 2020, as the first promotional single from the album.

A Spanish language dancehall and modern reggaeton track, it is a sensual song that hints at an intimate and romantic situation, expressing the feelings of someone who is anticipating "a return that may never happen". "Ponte Pa' Mí" received positive reviews from music critics, who complimented its smooth rhythms. The song debuted and peaked at number 32 in Spain and was certified gold in the country. An accompanying music video, released simultaneously with the song, was filmed in Miami, and directed by Gustavo "Gus" Camacho. The song was included on the set list for Alejandro's the Rauw Alejandro World Tour.

Background and release
In January 2020, Rauw Alejandro revealed the titles of four of his upcoming songs, including "Ponte Pa' Mí", which was highlighted to be a collaboration. In February 2020, he announced that he was working on his debut studio album Afrodisíaco. On April 12, 2020, he confirmed that "Ponte Pa' Mí" would be included in the album and wrote: "My next song is one of the most important projects I've worked on in my career. 'Musically' and 'Visually' I can fully show my art and my vision as an artist." The track was released for digital download and streaming by Duars Entertainment as the first promotional single from Afrodisíaco on April 16, 2020, being a collaboration with Myke Towers and Sky Rompiendo. It was later included as the 14th track on the album, released November 13, 2020.

Music and lyrics

Musically, "Ponte Pa' Mí" is a Spanish language dancehall and modern reggaeton song, written by Alejandro, Sky, Orlando J. Cepeda, José M. Reyes Díaz, Towers, Colla, and Eric Duars. Its production was handled by Sky, and the track runs for a total of three minutes and four seconds. Lyrically, "Ponte Pa' Mí" which translates to "Put on for Me" in English, is a sensual song that hints at an intimate and romantic situation. It express the feelings of someone who is anticipating "a return that may never happen". The lyrics begins with, "Sigo esperando que suene tu llamada / ¿Cuándo es que vas a volver? / Yo sé que me piensas / Como yo te pienso a ti" (I keep waiting for your call to ring / When are you going to come back? / I know that you think of me / The way I think of you).

Reception
Upon release, "Ponte Pa' Mí" was met with positive reviews from music critics. An author of Estación 40 named Alejandro and Towers the "two leaders of the new urban generation", while Angel Castillo from LoMasRankiaO labeled them "two of the most acclaimed hitmakers of the genre" and praised the use of "smooth" dancehall-influenced rhythms that created "the perfect formula for a contemporary reggaeton gem". Happy FM staff stated that Alejandro has "left us speechless" with the release of the song and described it as "a success that will give a lot to talk about in the coming months". In 2022, Ernesto Lechner from Rolling Stone ranked the track as the singer's ninth-best song.

"Ponte Pa' Mí" debuted and peaked at number 32 on Spain's official weekly chart on April 26, 2020. It was later certified gold by the Productores de Música de España (PROMUSICAE), for track-equivalent sales of over 20,000 units in the country.

Promotion

Music video

An accompanying music video was released simultaneously with the song. The visual was filmed in Miami, produced by Mastermind Entertainment, and directed by Gustavo "Gus" Camacho, who had also directed the videos for Alejandro's previous singles "Fantasías", "Fantasías (Remix)", and "Elegí". It contains the participation of both Alejandro and Towers, depicting Alejandro delivering a choreography.

Live performances
"Ponte Pa' Mí" was included on the set list for Alejandro's the Rauw Alejandro World Tour.

Track listing

Credits and personnel
Credits adapted from Tidal.

 Rauw Alejandro associated performer, composer, lyricist
 Myke Towers associated performer, composer, lyricist
 Sky Rompiendo associated performer, composer, lyricist, producer
 Orlando J. Cepeda composer, lyricist
 José M. Reyes Díaz composer, lyricist
 José M. Collazo "Colla" composer, lyricist, mastering engineer, mixing engineer
 Eric Pérez Rovira "Eric Duars" composer, lyricist, executive producer
 Amber Rubi Urena A&R coordinator
 John Eddie Pérez A&R director
 Jorge E. Pizarro "Kenobi" recording engineer

Charts

Certifications

Release history

References

2020 songs
2020 singles
Rauw Alejandro songs
Myke Towers songs
Songs written by Rauw Alejandro
Spanish-language songs